Henry Miller (February 18, 1931 – April 16, 2020) was an American lawyer and jurist. He was a past president of the New York Bar Association, and the author of several books and articles on trial advocacy; he was known as an expert in trial lawyering.

Early life and education
Miller was born in Brooklyn, the son of Henry A. and Anne Withers Miller, on February 18, 1931.

He attended St. John's College (class of 1952) and St. John's Law School (class of 1959).

Career

Miller was the senior partner of the law firm of Clark, Gagliardi & Miller, P.C., where he practiced trial work starting in 1966. He was president of the Westchester Bar Association and the New York Bar Association, the largest voluntary bar association in the United States. He received many awards, including the lifetime achievement award from New York State Trial Lawyers Association in 2015.

Miller was rated by other lawyers as one of the top two trial attorneys in the Westchester County, New York area. Among his notable cases was In re Joint Eastern & Southern Dist. Asbestos Litigation. He testified in favor of the Health Protection Act of 1987.

In 2010, Miller wrote and performed in All Too Human, a one man play about Clarence Darrow that toured in New York and New Jersey.

Personal life
Miller was married to Helena McCarty Miller; they had five children and ten grandchildren.

He died on April 16, 2020 in Mamaroneck, New York, from the effects of COVID-19,

References

External links
 Henry Miller at Avvo
 Article (behind paywall) from the 'New York Times Paid obituary in the 'New York Times
 Review of Miller's On Trial

1931 births
2020 deaths
Deaths from the COVID-19 pandemic in New York (state)
New York (state) lawyers
St. John's University (New York City) alumni
St. John's University School of Law alumni
21st-century American dramatists and playwrights
Lawyers from Brooklyn